The Legend of the Titanic is a 1999 animated fantasy film directed by Orlando Corradi and Kim J. Ok. The film is a very loose adaptation of the RMS Titanic sinking and featured several fantasy elements such as anthropomorphic animals.

The Legend of the Titanic was followed by a 2004 sequel titled Tentacolino and a 2011 television series Fantasy Island (not to be confused with the popular 1977-1984 fantasy drama of the same name).

Plot
In modern-day New York City, an old mouse named Connors tells his grandchildren the supposedly "true" story of the RMS Titanic, after discouraging one of his grandchildren from playing with a shark whistle.

In April 1912, Connors was a young sailor mouse on the Titanics maiden voyage from Southampton to New York. He is in charge of taking account for the mice who are making the trip through various maritime protocols. A young mouse from Recife, Brazil named Ronny who enjoys playing soccer befriends Connors, who also falls in love with Ronny's sister Stella. Meanwhile, a rich aristocratic woman named Elizabeth, her family (such as her father, the Duke of Camden), and a young Romani-Spanish man named Don Juan (who also falls in love with Elizabeth following Smiley taking her glove and passing it to him) board the Titanic, which immediately sets off.

Connors and Ronny learn all about what's going on with Elizabeth by their observations during their trips throughout the ship's ventilation system. They are appalled by the way Elizabeth is being badly treated, with her family insisting she marries to a posh whaling mogul named Everard Maltravers, and decide to help her. When Elizabeth goes to the bow of the ship that night, some dolphins begin communicating with her, explaining its possibility through magic moonbeams catching her tears as they fell into the water. They tell her of a conspiracy by her fiancée Maltravers, as he wishes to marry her just to get permission from her father to have global access to the oceans for his whaling operations. Maltravers' manservant Geoffreys is ordered to spy on Elizabeth's activities and uses the same whistle from the present story at the stern of the ship to call a jail attire-wearing shark named Mr. Ice, asking him to arrange the destruction of the ship.

Connors and Ronny introduce themselves to Elizabeth and offer to help her. Listening to their advice, Elizabeth tells her father she doesn't want to marry Maltravers, to which he accepts, despite having insisted she marry Maltravers earlier. Meanwhile, Don Juan's Rough Collie dog Smiley tries to look for Elizabeth to cheer up a love-sick Juan, meeting Connors and Ronny while at it, who help to arrange a meeting and dance for Elizabeth and Juan.

Elizabeth tells her father that she wants to marry Juan, and he agrees. Having failed to achieve their wedding plan, Elizabeth's stepmother and Maltravers decide to resort to drastic measures. They decide to hold Elizabeth's father up at gunpoint, force him to sign the whaling concession, and tie him up. Meanwhile, Mr. Ice and his gang of sharks prepares to sink the Titanic. Geoffreys asks the radio man to send an urgent wire from Maltravers to his whaling ships by telegraph, but the mice chew apart the wires to stop it from being sent.

Ice and his gang of sharks fools a giant octopus named Tentacles into heaving an iceberg to the surface of the ocean. The Titanic crashes into the iceberg, during which Maltravers and his entourage flee the ship in a lifeboat. In order to fix the telegraph wires, the mice enlist the help of a French mouse named Camembert, who insist they tie the wires to his moustache, seemingly electrocuting him to death.

Elizabeth and Juan manage to save her father and escort him to a lifeboat. Suddenly, several whales and dolphins arrive to help with the rescue, while a guilt-ridden but determined Tentacles tries to hold the bow and the stern together as they are splitting apart, and keep the ship on the surface for as long as possible. Elizabeth, Juan, Connors, Ronny, and Smiley jump off the Titanic into the sea and are saved by a whale. Once everyone on the ship has been saved, the Titanic finally sinks, taking Tentacles with it and seemingly crushing him. In the morning, the passengers are taken aboard the RMS Carpathia. The said ship arrives in New York and disembarks the passengers. Elizabeth and Juan are married, as are Connors and Stella. It is revealed that Tentacles and Camembert have actually both survived. Everyone celebrates at the Brooklyn Bridge, congratulating Tentacles for saving everyone.

The film ends with old Connors and Stella back in modern-day New York and Connors telling his grandchildren that whales are still hunted, and that they must do whatever they can to stop the whaling scheme at all costs. Stella ends off the film by telling the grandchildren: "Your grandfather loves to tell stories, but like all sailors, you shouldn't take him too seriously."

Cast

Original version
Emanuela Rossi – Elizabeth
Vittorio Guerrieri – Don Juan
Stefano Crescentini – Top Connors
Maria Teresa Cella – Ronnie
Luca Ward – Barone Van Der Tilt
Ferruccio Amendola – Denti di Ghiaccio
Oliviero Dinelli – Tentacolino

English dub
Gregory Snegoff – Maltravers / Smiley / Mr. Ice / Mouse Captain / Additional Mice
Francis Pardeilhan – Don Juan
Jane Alexander – Elizabeth Camden / Tentacles / Grandchildren
Anna Mazzotti – Ronnie / Stella / Dolphins / Additional Mice
Sean Patrick Lovett – Top Connors / Camembert / Geoffreys / Don Juan's Friend / Orcy
Teresa Pascarelli – Rachel / Dolphins
Mike Reynolds – Duke of Camden (uncredited)
Frank von Kuegelgen – Captain Edward J. Smith (uncredited)
John Stone – Mr. Krey (uncredited)

Production
The Legend of the Titanic was an international effort that involved North Korea's state owned SEK for animation, and Spanish ITB and American Hollywood Gang as producers, as well as an Italian writing team and musical composer.

Reception
Tim Brayton of Alternate Ending gave the movie a 0.5/5, stating "A giddy, so-bad-it's-the-most-essential-movie-I've-ever-seen disaster of tasteless incompetence."

See also
Titanic: The Legend Goes On, another animated film about the Titanic
List of films about the Titanic

References

External links

1999 films
1999 animated films
1990s rediscovered films
American animated films
American alternate history films
American fantasy films
Italian animated films
Italian alternate history films
Italian fantasy films
North Korean animated films
Spanish animated films
Spanish fantasy films
Animated films about mice
Films about cephalopods
Films about dolphins
Films about RMS Titanic
Films set in Hampshire
Films set in New York City
Rediscovered American films
Rediscovered Italian films
Rediscovered Spanish films